Wendy Wall is a singer, songwriter and poet based in New York City. She is perhaps best known for her song Postcards To The Stars which was recorded on SBK Records / Capitol Records.  This self-titled debut Wendy Wall was produced
by Grammy Award winning producer/engineer, Rob Fraboni.

Wall began recording original material in 1989 and was part of the eclectic female singer-songwriter wave that blossomed in the 1990s.  HITS Magazine stated that Wall had "a voice as deep and seductive as the still of midnight".

Recordings
As a folk-rock singer songwriter Wall wrote and recorded three studio albums. These projects featured guest musicians/ band members such as; Steve Holley, Larry Campbell, Joe Lala, Johnny Le Schell, Baker Lee, Kevin Jenkins, and Marc Shulman.  
In its first year of release, the debut CD Wendy Wall received 7 New York Music Awards nominations and won the prize for Best Contemporary Folk Album. It climbed to the #1 Album Chart Position at NAC Radio.

The song, 'The Proving Ground', was used during an episode of acclaimed television show China Beach and Wall's cover of The Zombies hit 'Time Of The Season' was included on the internationally released soundtrack for China Beach. Videos from the debut CD were in regular rotation on VH1 and Wendy Wall appeared as the musical guest star on Late Night with David Letterman, The Joan Lunden Show and was the musical guest star on the 1/2 hour music and talk show Nile Rodger's Inner Visions on VH1. The first single "Postcard to the Stars", a commentary on planet earth and the humans that inhabit it was featured on VH1's Earth Day Special Event.

The sophomore studio project, Two Birds was recorded and released in 2001 and was produced by Wall and Peter Gallway.

The Road To Paradise (released March 2009)was produced by Wall and Stewart Lerman.

The Simple Truth is recorded, but unreleased, according to the singer's web site.

Discography
The Simple Truth (unreleased):
(Track list unavailable)

The Road To Paradise:
I Woke Up Dreaming
Back in April
Hugging the Coast
Coming to Light
The Road to Paradise
Fool's Gold
What Do I  Do With Love
A Wing and a Prayer
The Wallflower Waltz
For All My Worrying
The Wisdom
Water Under the Bridge
Silence of Plenty

Two Birds:
The Long Goodbye
Water Water
The February Thaw
The Last Days of Winter
Time to Say Goodbye
Healings Hands
Two Birds
Every Now and Then
Time Traveler
Fall From Grace
By the Light of the Moon
When a Wild Thing Goes Free
When My Father Was Tall
Birdsong

Wendy Wall (self titled):
Dig That Crazy Beat
Real Love
Living in a State of Grace
Wandering the Streets of Modern America
Sweet Imagination
Postcard to the Stars
Missiles & Guns
Do It
A Woman's Voice
The Proving Ground
Sandcastles
Time & Change
Nothing Lasts Forever
The Thunderhead

Sources
 Official website
 KRUU FM
 The Valley Advocate, Northampton, MA.

References

Living people
American singer-songwriters
Year of birth missing (living people)